Hwang Jae-hun may refer to:

Hwang Jae-hun (footballer, born 1986)
Hwang Jae-hun (footballer, born 1990)